Year 1319 (MCCCXIX) was a common year starting on Monday (link will display the full calendar) of the Julian calendar.

Events 
 By place 

 Europe 
 May 8 – Upon the death of his maternal grandfather, King Haakon V (Magnusson), the three-year-old Magnus IV (Eriksson) becomes king of Norway.
 June – In preparation for a crusade, Infantes Peter of Castile and John of Castile summon their vassals to assemble an expeditionary army in Córdoba.
 June 25 – Battle of the Vega of Granada: Castilian forces (some 12,000 men) led by Peter of Castile are defeated by a Moorish relief army at Granada.
 July 8 – Magnus IV is elected king of Sweden, thus establishing a union with Norway. His mother Ingeborg of Norway is given a place in the regency.
 July 23 – Battle of Chios: A Knights Hospitaller-Genoese fleet (some 30 ships) led by Albert of Schwarzburg defeats a Turkish fleet, off Chios (or Scio).
 Summer – King Denis I (the Poet King) founds the Military Order of Christ reconstituted in Portugal. Former Knights Templar are enlisted in the order.
 December 22 – Prince James of Aragon renounces his right to inherit the Crown of Aragon, and his marriage to the 12-year-old Eleanor of Castile.

 England 
 September 20 – Battle of Myton: Scottish forces (some 15,000 men) led by James Douglas (the Black) defeat an English army in an encounter known as the Chapter of Myton because of the large number of clergymen involved. After the battle, King Edward II is forced to raise the siege at Berwick Castle and retreats south of the River Trent, allowing the Scots to ravage Cumberland and Westmorland unmolested. Queen Isabella, who is in York at this time, manages to escape to safety at Nottingham.
 December – Edward II negotiates a two-year truce with King Robert I (the Bruce), but a long-term peace is still far off because of Edward's arrogant refusal to relinquish his claims of sovereignty over the Scots.

 By topic 

 Commerce 
 November 13 – King Eric VI dies after a 33-year reign at Roskilde. During his rule, he attempts to control the routes of the Hanseatic League. The Hanse, an association of Baltic merchants, expels the English and Scots, and gains a monopoly of trade with Norway.

Births 
 March 20 – Laurence Hastings, English nobleman (d. 1348)
 April 26 – John II (the Good), king of France (d. 1364)
 September 5 – Peter IV, king of Aragon (d. 1387)
 date unknown
 Andrea II Muzaka, Albanian nobleman (d. 1372)
 Charles of Blois-Châtillon, French nobleman (d. 1364)
 Giulia della Rena, Italian nun, friar and saint (d. 1367)
 Hasan Kuchak, Mongol nobleman and prince (d. 1343)
 Haydar Amuli, Persian mystic and philosopher (d. 1385)
 Henry V of Iron, Polish nobleman and knight (d. 1369)
 James I, French nobleman and prince du sang (d. 1362)
 Joan of Penthièvre, Breton noblewoman (d. 1384)
 Kikuchi Takemitsu, Japanese general (d. 1373)
 Leonardo di Montaldo, doge of Genoa (d. 1384)
 María de la Cerda, Spanish noblewoman (d. 1375)
 Märta Ulfsdotter, Swedish noblewoman (d. 1371)
 Matteo II, Italian nobleman and co-ruler (d. 1355)
 Philip III, French nobleman and knight (d. 1337)
 Robert Marney, English knight and politician (d. 1400)
 Stephen II, German nobleman and co-ruler (d. 1375)
 Walter Paveley, English nobleman and knight (d. 1375)
 William Dacre, English nobleman and knight (d. 1361)

Deaths 
 January 12 – Kamāl al-Dīn al-Fārisī, Persian scientist (b. 1267)
 May 8 – Haakon V (Magnusson), king of Norway (b. 1270)
 May 19 – Louis of Évreux, son of Philip III (the Bold) (b. 1276)
 June 25 – (Battle of the Vega of Granada)
 John of Castile, Spanish nobleman and prince (b. 1262)
 Peter of Castile, Spanish nobleman and prince (b. 1290)
 August 12 – Rudolf I, German nobleman and knight (b. 1274)
 August 14 – Waldemar the Great, German nobleman (b. 1280)
 September 23 – Henry of Wierzbna, Polish priest and bishop
 October 18 – William Montagu, English nobleman and knight
 November 1 – Uguccione della Faggiuola, Italian condottieri
 November 2 – John Sandale, English bishop and chancellor
 November 5 – Simone Ballachi, Italian monk and friar (b. 1240)
 November 8 – Bokguk, Korean Grand Princess and queen
 November 11 – Beatrice of Luxembourg, queen of Hungary
 November 13 – Eric VI (Menved), king of Denmark (b. 1274)
 December 28 – Mattia de Nazarei, Italian abbess (b. 1253)
 date unknown
 Agnes Haakonsdatter, Norwegian princess (b. 1290)
 Andrea I, Albanian prince (House of Muzaka) (b. 1279)
 Bernard VI, French nobleman (House of Armagnac)
 Guan Daosheng, Chinese painter and poet (b. 1262)
 Ingeborg Magnusdotter, queen of Denmark (b. 1277)
 Jan Sindewint, Flemish monk, theologian and writer
 Jordan Óge de Exeter, Anglo-Irish knight and sheriff
 Qadi Baydawi, Persian jurist, theologian and writer
 Remigio dei Girolami, Italian theologian and writer

References